William MacLeod or William Macleod may refer to: 

 William Cleireach MacLeod (1365–?), Scottish clan chief
 William Dubh MacLeod ( – 80), Scottish clan chief
 William MacKintosh MacLeod (1861–1931), Scottish international rugby union player
 William Macleod (1850–1929), Australian artist
 William MacLeod (priest) (1867–1932), Anglican Provost of Wakefield Cathedral
 William A. MacLeod (1883–1961), Canadian physician and politician
 W. Bentley MacLeod (born 1954), Canadian-American economist

See also
 William McLeod (disambiguation)
 MacLeod, a surname